Phayakkhaphum Phisai is a district (amphoe) of Maha Sarakham province, northeastern Thailand.

Geography
Neighboring districts are (from the north clockwise): Yang Sisurat and Na Dun of Maha Sarakham Province; Pathum Rat, and Kaset Wisai of Roi Et province; Chumphon Buri of Surin province; and Phutthaisong of Buriram province.

Administration
The district is divided into 14 sub-districts (tambons), which are further subdivided into 227 villages (mubans). Phayakkhaphum Phisai is a sub-district municipality (thesaban tambon) which covers parts of tambons Palan and Lan Sakae. There are a further 14 tambon administrative organizations (TAO).

Missing numbers are tambons which now form Yang Sisurat District.

References

External links
amphoe.com (Thai)

Phayakkhaphum Phisai